The Women's 4x100m medley relay event at the 2010 South American Games was held on March 29 at 18:30.

Medalists

Records

Results

Final

References
Final

Medley Relay 4x100m W